The Horace Wilkinson Bridge (locally known as the New Bridge) is a cantilever bridge carrying Interstate 10 in Louisiana across the Mississippi River from Port Allen in West Baton Rouge Parish to Baton Rouge in East Baton Rouge Parish. Around the Baton Rouge metropolitan area, the bridge is more commonly known as the "New Bridge" because it is the younger of the two bridges that cross the river in Baton Rouge, downstream of the older Huey P. Long Bridge.

The structure begins at the Louisiana Highway 1 (LA 1) exit south of Port Allen. After the interstate crosses the superstructure, it remains an elevated viaduct up to the Dalrymple Drive exit to Louisiana State University. It is the highest bridge on the Mississippi River.

Name
The bridge is named after three separate Horace Wilkinsons who served a total of 54 years in the Louisiana legislature.  Horace Wilkinson, along with his son and grandson, were honored with the naming of the I-10 bridge by Act 206 of the Louisiana Legislature in 1968.

Traffic

The bridge is notorious amongst many for daily backups stretching a few miles (several kilometers). Most traffic stems from the I-10/I-110 junction. Eastbound traffic is reduced from three lanes to one through lane and an exit lane to Washington Street around a sharp curve. Because of this junction and lack of shoulders along the entire bridge, traffic usually backs up to, at least, the LA 415 exit (Exit 151) and for  along LA 1 northbound.

Westbound congestion occurs from slower traffic entering from the short transition zone of the St. Ferdinand Street entrance ramp and the narrowing of I-10 when it loses a lane to exit at LA 1.

In response, Sherri LeBas, secretary of the LA DOTD, said that as of November 2013, it was not looking at widening or modernizing the I-10/I-110 interchange, citing cost. Instead, the state will modernize LA 1 from I-10 to US-190 to encourage detours to the less-congested Huey Long Bridge.

Improvements
Around October 2003, the I-10E/I-110S merge was re-striped to reduce I-110 South from three lanes to two lanes, allowing I-10 its own lane, no longer mandating I-10 East commuters to shift to the left to continue on I-10 East.

In August 2010, the I-10 West exit to LA 1 had been restriped to prevent the center lane from exiting.  This change has since been reverted.

In 2010, the bridge's signage was replaced. These newer signs better demarcate the boundary between West Baton Rouge Parish and East Baton Rouge Parish. The installed signs also displayed the official name of the bridge.

A project began in 2015 to grind rust off the bridge.

See also
 
 
 
 List of crossings of the Lower Mississippi River

References

External links

 Horace Wilkinson Bridge by John Weeks

Bridges over the Mississippi River
Buildings and structures in Baton Rouge, Louisiana
Interstate 10
Bridges completed in 1968
Bridges on the Interstate Highway System
Road bridges in Louisiana
Cantilever bridges in the United States